Socarras or Socarrás is a surname. Notable people with the surname include:

Alberto Socarras (1908-1987), Cuban-American flautist
Carlos Prío Socarrás (1903–1977), Cuban politician
Hairon Socarras (born 1993), Cuban boxer
Karina Socarrás (born 1993), Puerto Rican footballer